{{Infobox Boxingmatch
|fight date=December 8, 2007
|Fight Name= Undefeated
|image=
|fighter1=Floyd Mayweather Jr.
|location= MGM Grand Garden Arena, Paradise, Nevada, U.S.
|nickname1=Pretty Boy
|record1=38–0 (24 KO)
|hometown1=Las Vegas, Nevada, U.S.
|recognition1= WBC and The Ring welterweight champion[[The Ring (magazine)|The Ring]] No. 1 ranked pound-for-pound fighter5-division world champion
|style1 = Orthodox
|height1 = 5 ft 8 in
|weight1 = 147 lb
|fighter2=Ricky Hatton
|nickname2=Hitman
|record2=43–0 (31 KO)
|style2= Orthodox
|height2 = 5 ft 6+1/2 in
|weight2 = 145 lb
|hometown2=Manchester, England
|recognition2= IBO and The Ring light welterweight championThe Ring No. 8 ranked pound-for-pound fighter2-division world champion
|titles=WBC and The Ring welterweight titles
|result=  Mayweather Jr. wins via 10th-round TKO
}}
Floyd Mayweather Jr. vs. Ricky Hatton, billed as Undefeated, was a boxing superfight that took place on December 8, 2007, at the MGM Grand Garden Arena in Las Vegas, between reigning WBC and The Ring welterweight champion Floyd Mayweather Jr. and reigning The Ring light welterweight champion Ricky Hatton.
 
The fight was for Mayweather's WBC & The Ring'' welterweight titles. Mayweather defeated Hatton by TKO in the tenth round.

General information
The referee for the fight was Joe Cortez, with Burt Clements, Dave Moretti and Paul Smith as the three judges. Hatton weighed in at 145 lbs and Mayweather at 147 lbs.

In attendance were celebrities such as Denzel Washington, Fábio Coentrão, Diego Milito, Bruce Willis, Sylvester Stallone, Angelina Jolie, Mario Lopez, Brad Pitt, Wesley Snipes, Will Ferrell, Gwen Stefani, Jimmy Kimmel, Tiger Woods, Jude Law, Jamie Hunt, David Lochery, footballer David Beckham, Kid Rock, fellow Dancing with the Stars alums, Wayne Newton, Mark Cuban and season 5 winner Hélio Castroneves and Karina Smirnoff, who is Mayweather's dance partner. At the weigh in the crowd were whipped into a frenzy as Joe Calzaghe (who was there supporting Hatton) squared up to American legend Bernard Hopkins (who was there supporting Mayweather).

Throughout the weigh-in, fans of Hatton could be heard singing "Hatton Wonderland" and booed Mayweather. Prior to the fight, Tom Jones sang "God Save the Queen", and Tyrese Gibson sang "The Star-Spangled Banner". 
 Hatton entered the ring first to "Blue Moon", his usual entrance music, Mayweather however chose a change of music for his entrance. In the week prior to the fight sections of the media, largely the British media had hyped the fight as something of a Britain against America fight, comparing the fight to when Lloyd Honeyghan travelled to America to dethrone American Don Curry, then the undisputed world champion, this leading to Mayweather's decision to enter the ring to Bruce Springsteen's "Born in the U.S.A.". Shortly before the start of the match, the Hatton fans also repeatedly booed the American national anthem, drawing large criticism post-fight.

The fight had 920,000 buys on HBO in the United States, and 1,150,000 buys in the United Kingdom on Sky Box Office.

Fight
Hatton tried to compete with Mayweather in the early rounds. In the first round Hatton caught Mayweather with a left jab which knocked Mayweather off balance. His constant pressure appeared to make Mayweather uncomfortable at first, but soon gave way. In the third round, Mayweather landed a right that cut Hatton above the right eye. In round six, referee Joe Cortez took a point away from Hatton after he threw punches at the back of Mayweathers' head when he was forced under the top rope. Hatton became angry at the referee's decision to deduct a point from him and turned his back on him in frustration, shaking his bottom at Mayweather. Hatton would later claim that he had become angry by the referee and that had caused him to lose his calm and contributed to his downfall. Hatton was able to hold his own, until round six, after Hatton got worn down from chasing Mayweather around the ring. Mayweather sensed the exhaustion of Hatton, and pursued Hatton's punches with stiff, damaging counterpunches. Mayweather was clearly in control before rocking Hatton in the 10th round. He knocked him down with a left hook, and Hatton was badly hurt. He looked disorientated when he got up, but referee Joe Cortez let the fight continue.

Mayweather wasted no time jumping on him again, landing a flurry of punches, including another left hook that sent Hatton staggering backward and down again. Cortez called off the fight at 1:35 without a count at the same time the white towel was thrown from Hatton's corner. The fight received large amounts of publicity, with both fighters promoting the fight heavily.

Aftermath
Mayweather announced his retirement from boxing on June 6, 2008. He returned to the ring 15 months later to beat Juan Manuel Márquez by a 12-round unanimous decision.
Mayweather went on to appear at World Wrestling Entertainment (WWE)'s No Way Out pay-per-view on February 17, 2008 in Las Vegas, Nevada, where he was involved in a storyline physical altercation with Big Show, which led to a match at WrestleMania XXIV.

Hatton defeated Juan Lazcano at the City of Manchester Stadium in Manchester on May 24, 2008 in a "thank-you" bout for the tremendous fan support he has received throughout his entire professional career.  The last time Hatton fought in Manchester was back in 2005 against Kostya Tszyu.
Hatton went on to fight Paul Malignaggi for the IBF light welterweight championship in November 2008. The fight was very one sided and Ricky won comfortably by way of TKO in the 11th round. Hatton would eventually lose to Manny Pacquiao via second-round KO and put his career on an indefinite hiatus. He eventually announced his retirement on 7 July 2011.

Undercard
 Daniel Ponce de León defeats  Eduardo Escobedo via unanimous decision for the WBO super bantamweight title.
 Jeff Lacy defeats  Peter Manfredo Jr. via unanimous decision.
 Edner Cherry KOs  Wes Ferguson in the sixth round.
 Matthew Hatton defeats  Frankie Santos via unanimous decision.
 Jonathan Oquendo KOs  Andres Ledesma in the first round.
 Jose Angel Rodriguez had a majority draw with  Ishmail Arvin.
 Daniel Jacobs KOs  Jose Jesus Hurtado in the first round.
 Danny Garcia KOs  Jesus Villareal in the second round.

References

Hatton
2007 in boxing
Boxing in Las Vegas
2007 in sports in Nevada
December 2007 sports events in the United States
MGM Grand Garden Arena
Nicknamed sporting events